West Baltimore station is a regional rail station located in the western part of the City of Baltimore, Maryland along the Northeast Corridor. It is served by MARC Penn Line trains. The station is positioned on an elevated grade above and between the nearby parallel West Mulberry and West Franklin Streets (U.S. Route 40) at 400 North Smallwood Street. Three large surface lots are available for commuters. The station is not accessible, with two low-level side platforms next to the outer tracks, but MTA Maryland plans to later renovate the station with accessible platforms and entrances.

History

Edmondson

The Baltimore and Potomac Railroad (B&P), owned by the Pennsylvania Railroad, opened to Baltimore in 1873. By the early 1900s, the PRR stopped at Lafayette and Calverton (also known as Gwynns Falls) west of Baltimore, serving local residential areas. Because both the B&P and the Northern Central Railway approached Penn Station from the west, PRR through trains from Washington to Harrisburg had to operate in reverse from Baltimore to Washington. To correct this, the PRR planned to replace the two stops with a single intercity-oriented station located between them, along with a wye at the north end of the Baltimore and Potomac Tunnel to allow trains to bypass Penn Station.

The PRR opened bidding for station construction, with an estimated cost of $50,000, in July 1916. The Spanish Mission style station, constructed of red brick with a terra-cotta tile roof, was designed by PRR staff architect William Holmes Cookman. The station, named Edmondson, opened on May 1, 1917. Original plans called for the installation of high-level platforms and a footbridge connecting them to the station building. However, this was delayed by the nationalization of railroads during World War I, and neither the station improvements nor the wye was ultimately built.

Unlike the comparable North Philadelphia station, Edmondson was not a success. It was far from the city center without a good transit connection to it, and without the wye the station did not serve Harrisburg trains. Instead of being a major intercity stop, Edmondson was mostly served by local commuter service between Washington and Baltimore. Local service continued under Penn Central from 1968 to 1976, then under Conrail until 1983, and finally as the Amtrak-operated, state-funded AMDOT service (renamed the MARC Penn Line in 1984). The station was briefly closed in March 1979 after an accident destroyed the stairway to the platform. Amtrak's Chesapeake, a limited-stop commuter train between Washington and Philadelphia, began stopping at Edmondson on July 29, 1979.  The Chesapeake was discontinued on October 30, 1983.

West Baltimore

Edmondson continued to be a stop on the state-funded commuter service. The Edmondson and Frederick Road stops were closed on April 27, 1984; they were replaced with West Baltimore station, two blocks to the south of Edmondson Avenue, on April 30. The stairs and platforms were removed, but the station building remains in place as a private business (which it had been converted to even before the stop closed).

In 2009, it was announced that approximately 400 parking spaces east of Pulaski Street would be added, as part of the project to remove the portion of Interstate 170 (now Route 40) that had never carried vehicular traffic. The spots were not to be permanent, but instead only available until redevelopment of the surrounding neighborhood. The expressway was demolished in the fall of 2010, and the spaces opened soon after.

West Baltimore station has attracted criticism for being unsafe due to crime and the poor conditions of the platforms and staircases, which are crumbling and rusted. As part of the larger project to repair the Interstate 170 area, the station will be improved over a period of several years. Immediate repairs to the stairs and platforms, as well as improved shelters and lighting, were made in 2014. Ultimately, the platforms will be extended to serve more cars per train and raised for accessibility, and ramps built to surrounding streets. The Red Line light rail service, originally planned to begin construction in 2015 (before its cancellation that year) and open in 2022, was to run along the Route 40 corridor in the median of the highway underneath the elevated city streets with a stop at West Baltimore. Escalators and elevators would be used to transport commuters from the station to the streets above the Route 40 corridor in West Baltimore.

Bus connections
The station is also served by 6 MTA Bus routes:
PK CityLink Pink - West Baltimore to Cedonia
OR CityLink Orange - West Baltimore to Essex
BL CityLink Blue - Johns Hopkins Bayview to Westgate / CMS
26 LocalLink 26 - Mondawmin Metro to South Baltimore Park & Ride
77 LocalLink 77 - West Baltimore MARC to Catonsville 
150 Express BusLink 150 - Harbor East to Columbia (WB stop on Franklin, EB stop on Mulberry, does not serve bus terminal)

References

External links

Franklin Street entrance from Google Maps Street View
West Baltimore MARC Station Project

Stations on the Northeast Corridor
MARC Train stations
Penn Line
Railway stations in Baltimore
Railway stations in the United States opened in 1984
1984 establishments in Maryland
West Baltimore